Yavu can refer to:

 Yavu, Demre
 Yavu, İskilip